Buðli or Budli is the name of one or two legendary kings from the Scandinavian Legendary sagas.

Ásmundar saga kappabana
According to the Ásmundar saga kappabana, Buðli was a Swedish king, and the father of Hildr. 

The saga relates that Hildr married Helgi, the son of Hildebrand, the king of the Huns. Helgi and Hildr had a son who was raised by his paternal grandfather and named Hildebrand after him.

Hildebrand became a great warrior and was called the Hunnish champion. When his father Helgi had fallen in a war, his maternal grandfather, the Swedish king Buðli, was killed by a Danish king by the name Alf. This Alf took Hildrebrand's mother Hildr captive and gave her to the champion Aki with whom she had the son Asmund who is the protagonist of the saga.

Völsunga saga
In the Völsunga saga, Buðli was the father of Brynhildr (Brünnehilde).

Mythological kings of Sweden
Nibelung tradition
Völsung cycle
Legendary sagas